David Clarkson Nicholls (born 5 April 1972) is a Scottish football player and coach, who played for Clydebank, Falkirk and Dunfermline Athletic (where he scored once against St Johnstone) amongst other clubs. Nicholls played for Gretna in the 2006 Scottish Cup Final and helped them secure three successive promotions.

Nicholls was assistant manager of East Stirlingshire, working for manager Jim McInally. Nicholls and McInally left the club in May 2011. Nicholls then became assistant manager of Peterhead, again assisting McInally. He became caretaker manager in November 2022 after McInally resigned.

References

External links

1972 births
Living people
Footballers from Bellshill
Scottish footballers
Association football midfielders
Hibernian F.C. players
Coleraine F.C. players
Hamilton Academical F.C. players
Cork City F.C. players
Clydebank F.C. (1965) players
Falkirk F.C. players
Dunfermline Athletic F.C. players
Gretna F.C. players
East Stirlingshire F.C. players
Scottish Football League players
NIFL Premiership players
League of Ireland players
Scottish Premier League players
Bellshill Athletic F.C. players
Newcastle Blue Star F.C. players